Dietersheim is a municipality in the district of Neustadt (Aisch)-Bad Windsheim in Bavaria in Germany.

Mayor
Robert Christensen is the mayor since 2010. He is the successor of Wolfgang Breyer, who died unexpected.

Personalities

Sons and daughters of the community 
 Carl Heinrich Wilhelm Hagen (1810-1868), historian and deputy of the National Assembly in the Paulskirche
 Friedrich Wilhelm Hagen (1814-1888), representative of the human psychiatry and one of the responsible persons for the desecration of Ludwig II of Bavaria

Other personalities associated with the community 
 Günter Schwanhäußer (1928-2014), entrepreneur ("Schwan-Stabilo", marker-pen) lived for a long time in the district of Altheim

References

Neustadt (Aisch)-Bad Windsheim